was a Japanese politician from Hokkaidō. He committed suicide at a hotel in Sapporo after he was defeated in the presidency election of the LDP—losing the chance to become prime minister.

Personal life
Nakagawa's eldest son was Shōichi Nakagawa, a House of Representatives member. Shōichi also committed suicide in 2009. Nakagawa's younger brother is Yoshio Nakagawa.

References

|-

|-

|-

1925 births
1983 suicides
Ministers of Agriculture, Forestry and Fisheries of Japan
Members of the House of Representatives (Japan)
Japanese politicians who committed suicide
Japanese anti-communists
People from Hokkaido
Suicides by hanging in Japan
Kyushu University alumni